Elena Bovina and Zsófia Gubacsi were the defending champions, but Bovina decided to compete in Charleston at the same week. Gubacsi teamed up with Katarina Dašković and lost in first round to wildcards Vanessa Menga and Ana Catarina Nogueira.

Petra Mandula and Patricia Wartusch won the title by defeating Maret Ani and Emmanuelle Gagliardi 6–7(3–7), 7–6(7–3), 6–2 in the final.

Seeds

Draw

Draw

References

External links
 Official results archive (ITF)
 Official results archive (WTA)

2003 Women's Doubles
Doubles
Estoril Open